Yarkon Cemetery is the main cemetery for the Tel Aviv Metropolitan Area of Israel. It is located within the Petah Tikva city limits, between the Yarkon River in the West, Highway 5 in the North, and the 491 road from East and South.

History
The need to establish the cemetery was driven by crowding in the Southern Cemetery in Bat Yam. A number of locations were considered, including the area north of Ramat Aviv. The eventual location was preferred for being relatively far from the center of Tel Aviv. The cemetery was opened by chief rabbis Hayim David HaLevi and Israel Meir Lau in 1991.

Yarkon Cemetery is now the only cemetery in the Dan Region where plots are available free of charge, serving Tel Aviv, Ramat Gan, Holon, Bat Yam, Kiryat Ono and other cities in the center of the country.
An elliptical road surrounds the central part, giving access to the cemetery and parking areas by traffic and buses. There are three memorial halls close to the road. One of the problems of the cemetery is the rising water level of the Yarkon River during rainy winters.

With the traditional burial grounds at near capacity, with 110,000 graves across 150 acres, a series of 30 vertical structures are under construction that will provide space for 250,000 more graves.

Notable interred

 David Avidan (1934–1995), Israeli poet
 Shosh Atari (1949–2008), Israeli radio personality 
 Yona Atari (1933–2019), Israeli singer and actress
 Sasha Argov (1914–1995), Israeli composer
 Mia Arbatova (1911–1990), Israeli ballet dancer
 Shlomo Aronson (1936–2020), Israeli historian
 Yardena Alotin (1930–1994), Israeli composer and pianist 
 Avraham Bendori (1928–2019), Israeli footballer
 Debbi Besserglick (1955–2005), Israeli actress
 Menachem Banitt (1914–2007), Belgian-Israeli scholar
 Avraham Biton (1923–2005), Israeli politician
 Rafael Bash (1913–2000), Israeli politician 
 Rozina Cambos (1951–2012), Israeli actress
 Shlomo Cohen-Tzidon (1923–2012), Israeli politician 
 Gamliel Cohen (1922–2002), Israeli intelligence officer
 Sarah Doron (1922–2010), Israeli politician
 Shimon Even (1935–2004), Israeli researcher
 Nissim Eliad (1919–2014), Israeli politician
 Shmuel Gogol (1924–1993), Israeli musician 
 Kariel Gardosh (1921–2000), Israeli cartoonist 
 Gila Goldstein (1947–2017), Israeli actress and activist 
 Ofra Haza (1957–2000), Israeli singer
 Isser Harel (1912–2003), Israeli intelligence officer
 Uzi Hitman (1952–2004), Israeli singer
 Amir Kertes (1964–2018), Israeli singer
 Shmuel Katz (1914–2008), Israeli politician and journalist
 Shmulik Kraus (1935–2013), Israeli singer-songwriter
 Sara Hestrin-Lerner (1918–2017), Israeli physiologist
 Amos Lavi (1953–2010), Israeli actor
 Arik Lavie (1927–2004), Israeli singer and actor
 Sara Levi-Tanai (1910–2005), Israeli choreographer 
 Esther Lurie (1913–1998), Israeli painter
 Mordechai Mishani (1945–2013), Israeli politician 
 Yigal Mossinson (1917–1994), Israeli playwright 
 Dov Milman (1919–2007), Israeli politician 
 George Ovadiah (1925–1996), Israeli film director 
 Yigal Cohen-Orgad (1937–2019), Israeli politician 
 Edward Olearczyk (1915–1994), Polish-Israeli composer 
 Avner Shaki (1926–2005), Israeli politician
 Shin Shifra (1931–2012), Israeli poet
 Reuven Shefer (1925–2011), Israeli actor
 Gideon Singer (1926–2015), Israeli actor and singer
 Mordecai Seter (1916–1994), Israeli composer
 Pnina Salzman (1922–2006), Israeli pianist
 Yehuda Sha'ari (1920–1997), Israeli politician 
 Dudu Topaz (1946–2009), Israeli television presenter
 Meir Vilner (1918–2003), Israeli politician 
 Mordechai Virshubski (1930–2012), Israeli politician
 Yehoshua Zettler (1917–2009), Israeli Lehi commander

References

External links 

  Yarkon Cemetery in Chevra kadisha – Tel Aviv Jaffa

Jewish cemeteries in Israel
Cemeteries in the Tel Aviv metropolitan area